The Tribune Building is a historic commercial building in Salt Lake City, Utah, United States, that is listed on the National Register of Historic Places (NRHP).

Description
It is located at 137 South Main Street and built in 1924. It was listed on the NRHP July 30, 2012.

It has also been known as the Ezra Thompson Building after three-time mayor Ezra Thompson, or as the former Salt Lake Tribune building, as the newspaper was a longtime occupant until 2005.

It was one of only four high-rise buildings constructed in Salt Lake City between World War I and the Great Depression.

The property was vacant in 2008 when it was purchased by investors, as part of a transaction reported to be for $3.9 million.

In 2013 it became home of Neumont University.

It was a work of architects Pope & Burton. It is a two-part commercial block building.  Although the lower level's facade has been modified, the building retains its notable terra cotta cornice.

See also

 National Register of Historic Places listings in Salt Lake City

Notes

References

External links

National Register of Historic Places in Salt Lake City
Late 19th and Early 20th Century American Movements architecture
Buildings and structures completed in 1924